Zhao Qingjian (born March 15, 1978) is a retired professional wushu taolu athlete who is originally from Shandong. Through his numerous successes in national and international competitions, he established himself as one of the greatest wushu taolu athletes of the 2000s.

Career 
Zhao was a shaolinquan practitioner throughout his youth. He later joined a performance troupe which went on tours throughout the United States, Asia, and Europe during the mid-1990s. Zhao then enrolled and graduated from the Wuhan Sports University. In 1999, he was recruited by coach Wu Bin and joined the Beijing Wushu Team. Zhao's first competition representing Beijing was in the 2000 National Taolu Championships where he won a gold medal in daoshu. At the 2001 National Games of China, he won the silver medal in the changquan combined event which featured rounds for an optional routine and the IWUF second compulsory routine. 

Zhao's international debut was at the 2003 World Wushu Championships where he won gold in the changquan event and in the duilian event with Wei Jian and Yi Peng. He then won gold in the daoshu and gunshu combined event at the 2005 East Asian Games. The same year, he also won a gold medal in changquan and a silver medal in daoshu and gunshu combined at the 2005 National Games of China. After winning gold in daoshu at the 2007 World Wushu Championships, Zhao qualified to compete in the 2008 Beijing Wushu Tournament and won in the daoshu and gunshu combined event by a significant margin. A year later, he won gold in the same combined event at the 2009 World Games. Shortly after, Zhao was able to win in the changquan event at the 2009 National Games of China, narrowly placing above Yuan Xiaochao. Zhao subsequently retired from competition.

Today, Zhao hosts seminars on wushu and shaolinquan throughout China, the United States, and other Asian and European countries.

See also 

 China national wushu team

References

External links 

 Athlete profile at the 2008 Beijing Wushu Tournament

1978 births
Living people
Chinese wushu practitioners
Competitors at the 2008 Beijing Wushu Tournament
Shaolinquan practitioners
Sportspeople from Shandong
Sportspeople from Beijing
Beijing Sport University alumni